Antonio Garrido (born 2 February 1944) is a Spanish professional golfer. He won five times on the European Tour and twice on the European Senior Tour. He played in the 1979 Ryder Cup, the first Ryder Cup in which Continental European golfers were eligible to play.

Professional career
Garrido played on the European Tour from its first official season in 1972 and won five tournaments between 1972 and 1986. He is notable for winning the first ever official European Tour event, the 1972 Spanish Open. His best year was 1977 when he won the Madrid Open and the Benson & Hedges International Open and finished third on the Order of Merit. That same season he teamed up with Seve Ballesteros to win the World Cup of Golf for Spain, finishing three strokes ahead of the Philippines. Following this World Cup success he received an invitation to play in the 1978 Masters Tournament, where he missed the cut. In 1979, when players from Continental Europe became eligible to play in the Ryder Cup, Garrido and Ballesteros were the only two Continental Europe to compete.

Garrido played on the European Senior Tour from 1994. He was particularly successful from 1994 to 1999, never finishing lower than 11th in the Order of Merit, winning twice, the 1994 Shell Scottish Seniors Open and the 1997 Lawrence Batley Seniors, and being a runner-up 12 times.

Personal life
Garrido's son Ignacio was a successful European Tour golfer; having won the 2003 Volvo PGA Championship. 

In 1997 the Garridos became the second father and son combination to have played in the Ryder Cup after Percy and Peter Alliss. Antonio Garrido's younger brother Germán was also a European Tour golfer. The two of them were the first pair of brothers to win on the European Tour. They were later followed by Manuel and Seve Ballesteros,  Francesco and Edoardo Molinari as well as Rasmus and Nicolai Højgaard.

Professional wins (27)

European Tour wins (5)

European Tour playoff record (2–1)

Challenge Tour wins (1)
1990 Torras Hostench 2

Other wins (11)
1966 Castilla Tournament (Spain)
1969 Spanish Professional Closed Championship
1975 Spanish Professional Closed Championship
1977 World Cup (with Seve Ballesteros)
1979 Spanish Professional Closed Championship
1980 Spanish Professional Closed Championship
1981 Spanish Professional Closed Championship
1983 Castilia Tournament (Spain)
1988 Castilia Tournament (Spain)
1989 Castilia Tournament (Spain)
1990 Castilia Tournament (Spain)

European Senior Tour wins (2)

European Senior Tour playoff record (0–4)

Other senior wins (8)
1994 Champion Seniors Open (Australia), Argentine Senior PGA Championship
1995 Spanish Seniors Professional Closed Championship
1996 Spanish Seniors Professional Closed Championship
1997 Spanish Seniors Professional Closed Championship
1998 Spanish Seniors Professional Closed Championship
2000 Spanish Seniors Professional Closed Championship
2001 Spanish Seniors Professional Closed Championship
Source:

Results in major championships

Note: Garrido never played in the U.S. Open or PGA Championship.

CUT = missed the half-way cut (3rd round cut in 1969, 1977 and 1982 Open Championships)
"T" indicates a tie for a place

Team appearances
Ryder Cup (representing Europe): 1979
World Cup (representing Spain): 1977 (winners), 1978, 1979
Double Diamond International (representing Continental Europe): 1976
Philip Morris International (representing Spain): 1976
Hennessy Cognac Cup  (representing the Continent of Europe): 1976, 1978, 1980, 1982, (representing Spain) 1984
Europcar Cup (representing Spain): 1986, 1987 (winners), 1988
Praia d'El Rey European Cup: 1997 (winners), 1999

References

External links

Spanish male golfers
European Tour golfers
European Senior Tour golfers
Ryder Cup competitors for Europe
Golfers from Madrid
1944 births
Living people